Matt Huffman (born April 1, 1960) is an American politician serving as a member of the Ohio Senate, representing the 12th district since 2017, and currently serving as the Ohio Senate Majority Leader as a Republican. The district includes Allen, Champaign, Mercer and Shelby counties, as well as parts of Auglaize, Darke and Logan counties.

Huffman is the former Speaker Pro Tempore of the Ohio House of Representatives, and served in the House from 2007 to 2014. Prior to his service in the House, he served as president of Lima City Council for seven years. He is an attorney with Lima law firm, Huffman, Kelley, Brock & Gottschalk.

Career
A graduate of the University of Notre Dame and the University of Cincinnati, Huffman is an attorney with Lima law firm Huffman, Kelley, Brock & Gottschalk and previously served as president of Lima City Council for seven years.

When John R. Willamowski was ineligible to run for another term, Huffman entered the race to succeed him. Huffman ultimately won in the overwhelmingly Republican district, and took a seat on January 2, 2007. He won reelection in 2008, and 2010.

In the 128th General Assembly, Huffman was chosen by House Republicans to serve as the Chairman of the Ohio House Republican Organizational Committee.  After a strong showing and a take-back of the Majority for the 129th General Assembly, Huffman is serving as majority floor leader. He also is a member of the Education Committee; the Judiciary and Ethics Committee; the State Government and Elections Committee and the State Government and Elections Subcommittee on Redistricting (as Chair); as a member of the Joint Legislative Ethics Committee, and on the Ohio Legislative Service Commission.

Huffman won a fourth term in 2012 with 67% of the vote against Democrat Robert Huenke.

Ohio Senate
Sitting out two years from elected office, Huffman decided to run for the Ohio Senate in 2016 to succeed term-limited President of the Ohio Senate Keith Faber, who in term was running for the House. Facing John Adams in the Republican primary, a former ally and friend from his House days, Huffman won the nomination with nearly 64% of the vote.  He was unopposed in the general election.

Positions and policies
Huffman has introduced measures that would increase from 70 to 75 the maximum age at which an attorney could seek election as a judge. Proponents include the Supreme Court of Ohio, the Ohio State Bar Association and the Association of Municipal/County Judges.  Ultimately, the legislation passed the Ohio House of Representatives 70–17 and with passage by the Senate, will go to the ballot in November 2011. In talking of his support of the measure, Huffman has acknowledged that in the 129th Ohio General Assembly, the Ohio House of Representatives has members ranging from ages 21 to 77.

He has also sought to abolish a Bureau of Motor Vehicles program which randomly sends out about 5,400 letters each week requiring Ohio drivers send in proof of insurance, stating "chronically uninsured," people who can't afford insurance or have multiple license suspensions, find ways around the verification program because they need to drive to work. "We're not going to solve that problem."

A supporter of S.B. 5 which looks to limit collective bargaining, Huffman says that the bill controls government, and brings fairness and transparency to the public.

Huffman is a supporter of a provision that is set to allow drilling in state parks, saying that it could be an asset to helping to reinvigorate Ohio's lackluster economy if it takes off.  He voted for its passage out of the Ohio House of Representatives.

In 2021, he voted for legislation that would make it harder to build wind and solar energy projects in Ohio. Solar and wind energy projects could be killed by local officials, whereas natural gas and oil projects could not. Huffman argued that this discrepancy was warranted because renewable energy production did not produce enough energy in Ohio.

Controversies
Matt Huffman has been accused of gerrymandering and being in contempt of court after the Ohio Supreme Court ruled three separate maps drawn under him and representative Bob Cupp to be unconstitutional under the Ohio Constitution. This incident, along with further alleged attempts to gerrymander was featured on the episode Mapmaker, Mapmaker, Make Me a Map of the Chicago Public Radio show and podcast This American Life. Matt Huffman has argued that he should not be held in contempt because of an obscure legal theory called "The independent state legislature doctrine" which claims state legislatures have more power than state supreme courts. However, this has been historically rejected by the U.S. supreme court, but is currently being prepared to be considered in a new ruling.

References

External links
 Matt Huffman for Ohio House official campaign site
 Project Vote Smart – Matt Huffman
 
 

|-

1960 births
21st-century American politicians
Living people
Republican Party members of the Ohio House of Representatives
Republican Party Ohio state senators
Politicians from Lima, Ohio
Presidents of the Ohio State Senate
University of Cincinnati alumni
University of Notre Dame alumni